Titiyo Yambalu Felicia Jah (born 23 July 1967) is a Swedish singer and songwriter who has won four Grammis.

Biography

Early life
Titiyo was born in Stockholm, Sweden, to Ahmadu Jah, a Sierra Leonean drummer, and Maylen Bergström. She is the half-sister of singer-songwriter Neneh Cherry. She grew up in Solna.

Musical career
Titiyo discovered her own singing abilities when invited by her older sister to sing with her at a studio in London. She fronted her own band in 1987 and played the Stockholm circuit, and signed with a local label, Telegram, in 1989. She also sang background vocals for a range of Swedish artists, including Army of Lovers and Jakob Hellman. In 1989, Titiyo released her self-titled debut album, which topped at No. 3 in Sweden, and was released in the United States on Arista, and became one of the contributions to a Swedish R&B wave in the US that lasted throughout the nineties. The single "My Body Says Yes" was a hit in North America, and "Talking to the Man in the Moon" reached No. 6 in the Swedish charts; the subsequent single, "After the Rain," reached No. 13.

Titiyo took a two-year break and returned in 1993 with the Aretha Franklin cover "Never Let Me Go" (a hit that reached number 25 on Swedish chart), later included on her second full-length This is Titiyo. Remixes of this and some of her other songs were popular in the London club scene. Her third album, Extended, produced by Kent (Gillström) Isaacs (released by the Swedish label Diesel Music), appeared in 1997, producing the hit single "Josefin Dean" (named after Mariah Carey's best friend).

In 2001, Titiyo revitalised her career with her successful fourth studio album Come Along (released in the US in 2002; also on Diesel Music), spawning the eponymous single "Come Along", which became an international hit. Produced by Peter Svensson (The Cardigans) and Joakim Berg (Kent), the album and its title song made it to the top of in the Swedish charts, while the single was a success in several European countries including France, (Germany), Switzerland, and the Netherlands. The second single from the album, "1989", was not nearly as successful as its predecessor but reached the top-30 of the French singles chart.

After a lengthy hiatus, Warner Music released a greatest hits album named Best of Titiyo in 2004, which included two new songs. One of these songs, "Loving out of Nothing", charted within the top-20 in Sweden in early 2005.

In spring 2008, Titiyo was asked to contribute vocals to Kleerup's single "Longing for Lullabies". Released in April 2008 in Scandinavia, the single has since reached the top 20 in Denmark and top 10 in Sweden.

Titiyo released her fifth album, Hidden, on the Swedish independent label Sheriff late 2008. The album mainly feature self-penned material but also results of collaborations with the likes of Kleerup, Moto Boy, and Goran Kajfes of Oddjob. So far videos for "Stumble to Fall" and "Awakening" have been released.

In 2015, she released her sixth studio album, 13 Gården, which was nominated for a Swedish Grammy in the category "Best Pop". Named after her childhood address in the Solna Municipality, outside of Stockholm, it was Titiyo's first album to be recorded entirely in the Swedish language.

Personal life
Titiyo's daughter Femi was born in 1992. Femi's father is music producer Magnus Frykberg.

Discography

Studio albums

Compilations

Selected singles

Awards 
Grammis

As of 2011, Titiyo has won four Grammis:

|-
| 1990
| rowspan=2|Herself
| Newcomer of the Year 
| 
|-
| rowspan=2|1991
| Best Female Pop/Rock Artist 
| 
|-
| "Flowers"
| Best Music Video
| 
|-
| 1994
| rowspan=3|Herself
| rowspan=3|Best Female Pop/Rock Artist 
| 
|-
| 1998
| 
|-
| rowspan=3|2002
| 
|-
| Come Along
| Best Album
| 
|-
| "Come Along"
| Best Song
| 
|-
| 2005
| A Collection of Songs
| Best Compilation
| 
|-
| 2009
| "Longing for Lullabies"
| Best Song
| 
|-
| 2016
| Herself
| Best Pop Artist 
| 

MTV Europe Music Awards
 2001: Best Nordic Act (nominated)

P3 Guld Music Awards
 2009: Best Song for "Longing for Lullabies" (nominated)

References

External links 

 Official website 

1967 births
Living people
Singers from Stockholm
Swedish women singers
Swedish women musicians
Swedish people of Sierra Leonean descent
Grammy Award winners
English-language singers from Sweden